Youssouf Traoré (born 29 January 1991) is an Ivorian professional footballer who plays as a midfielder for JA Drancy.

References

1991 births
Living people
Ivorian footballers
Ivorian expatriate footballers
Association football midfielders
Championnat National 2 players
Championnat National 3 players
Swiss Super League players
Swiss Challenge League players
BSC Young Boys players
FC Lausanne-Sport players
US Roye-Noyon players
UJA Maccabi Paris Métropole players
GOAL FC players
JA Drancy players
Ivorian expatriate sportspeople in Switzerland
Ivorian expatriate sportspeople in France
Expatriate footballers in Switzerland
Expatriate footballers in France